Anne Giardini, is a Canadian business executive, journalist, lawyer and writer. She is the oldest daughter of late Canadian novelist Carol Shields. Giardini is licensed to practice law in British Columbia (and formerly in Ontario and Washington State). As a journalist, Giardini has contributed to the National Post as a columnist. She lives in Vancouver, British Columbia with her husband of more than 30 years. They have three grown children. She has written two novels, The Sad Truth about Happiness (2005) and Advice for Italian Boys (2009), both published by HarperCollins. Giardini and her son, Nicholas Giardini, edited Startle and Illuminate (Random House Canada, 2016), a book of Carol Shields' thoughts and advice on writing. Giardini served as the 11th chancellor of Simon Fraser University from 2014 to 2020.

From 2008 to 2014, Giardini was president of Weyerhaeuser Company Limited, a subsidiary of Weyerhaeuser Company, in the forestry industry. She joined Weyerhaeuser in 1994 and became Canadian vice-president and general counsel in 2006.

Giardini is an active volunteer and on the board of a number of Vancouver organizations, including having served as Chair of the Greater Vancouver Board of Trade, Vancouver International Writers Festival (chair), UniverCity at SFU, and Simon Fraser University (deputy chair). She is also a supporter of Plan Canada and volunteer for Vancouver YWCA's Women of Distinction Awards and Young Women in Business. She has been on the boards of Hydro One, CMHC and TransLink, among others.

Giardini was awarded a Queen Elizabeth II Diamond Jubilee Medal in January 2013 for her fundraising efforts for Plan Canada's Because I'm a Girl campaign, which supports females in Tanzania. In 2016, Giardini was appointed an Officer of the Order of Canada.  She was appointed an Officer of British Columbia in 2018.

Education 

 Cambridge University, Trinity Hall — LLM, Law (1987 – 1988)
 The University of British Columbia — LLB, Law (1981 – 1984)
 Simon Fraser University — BA, Economics (1978 – 1980)
 University of Ottawa / Université d'Ottawa — Economics (1977 – 1978)

Bibliography 

 The Sad Truth about Happiness (HarperCollins, 2005) 
 Advice for Italian Boys (HarperCollins, 2009)
 Startle and Illuminate (Random House, 2016) (edited with Nicholas Giardini)

Awards
 Shortlisted for the Amazon.ca First Novel Award, 2005
 Winner of the Audie Awards, 2007
 Appointed Queen's Counsel, 2010

Notes

1959 births
Living people
20th-century Canadian businesswomen
20th-century Canadian businesspeople
20th-century Canadian women writers
21st-century Canadian businesswomen
21st-century Canadian businesspeople
21st-century Canadian novelists
21st-century Canadian women writers
Alumni of Trinity Hall, Cambridge
Businesspeople from Vancouver
Canadian business executives
Canadian newspaper journalists
Canadian King's Counsel
Women chief executives
Canadian women lawyers
Canadian women journalists
Canadian women non-fiction writers
Canadian women novelists
Lawyers in British Columbia
Lawyers in Ontario
National Post people
Officers of the Order of Canada
Peter A. Allard School of Law alumni
Simon Fraser University alumni
University of British Columbia alumni
Weyerhaeuser
Women business executives
Writers from Vancouver
Members of the Order of British Columbia